The Ca' Zenobio degli Armeni (Palazzo Zenobio, Ca' Zenobio) is a Baroque-style palace structure in the sestiere of Dorsoduro, in Venice, Italy. The nearby bridge Ponte del Soccorso connects it to the Palazzo Ariani.

History
The palace initially was constructed in 1690 by the Zenobio family, who retained possession til the 19th century. The design was by the architect Gaspari, pupil of Baldassare Longhena. In 1850 it became the home of the College of the Armenian (Armeni) monks of the Mekhitarist order who had a monastery in the island of San Lazzaro degli Armeni near Venice. The Hall of Mirrors or Sala degli Specchi was a ballroom, and the adjacent room was decorated by Ludovico Dorigny, Gregorio Lazzarini, and a young Giovanni Battista Tiepolo. The panels depict mythologic scenes and the life of Queen Zenobia, of the 3rd-century Palmyrene Empire, putatively ancestor of this family. The entrance has vedute by Luca Carlevarijis. The archive and library in the garden were designed by the Neoclassical architect Tommaso Temanza.

References

Houses completed in the 17th century
Zenobio degli Armeni
Baroque architecture in Venice